Anton "Toni" Polster (born 10 March 1964) is an Austrian professional football coach and former player. He is the all-time leading goalscorer for the Austria national team with 44 goals.

Polster's top flight coaching debut at Admira Wacker lasted just three league games before he was sacked on 10 August 2013.

Club career
Polster came through the Austria Wien youth system to make his professional league debut in August 1982, at 18 years of age. He scored his first Bundesliga goal three weeks later and went on to win three league titles and a domestic cup before moving abroad to play a season in Serie A with Torino. He then spent the five following years at Spanish teams Sevilla, Logroñés and Rayo Vallecano, ending up with these teams in mid-table as well except for one year, 1989–90, in which Sevilla FC ended in sixth place and played UEFA Cup the following year. In 1990, he finished runner-up in the Spanish goalscoring chart. In 1993, he moved to Germany to spend five years at Köln, again ending up in mid-table every season except for the last one in which he experienced relegation. That made him join Borussia Mönchengladbach next year but they got also relegated at the end of the season and Polster returned to Austria to play a final season at Austria Salzburg.

He was known to fans as "Toni Doppelpack" – "Toni Brace", because of his reputation for scoring two goals in many matches.

Polster was chosen in Austria's Team of the Century in 2001 and as Austrian Sportsman of the Year 1997.

International career
In 1983, Polster was selected for the Austria U20's to play at the 1983 FIFA World Youth Championship.

He had already made his senior debut for Austria in November 1982 against Turkey, immediately scoring his first goal, and was a participant at the 1990 World Cup and 1998 World Cup. He earned 95 caps, scoring a record 44 goals. He overtook the previous goalscoring record, set by Hans Krankl, in November 1996, scoring his 35th goal against Latvia.

His final (and record-breaking 94th) international was thought to be a 1998 FIFA World Cup match against Italy in June, but he was given an official farewell match in September 2000 against Iran, in which he was substituted in the 21st minute by Christian Mayrleb. His appearances record was surpassed by Andreas Herzog in May 2002.

Coaching career
Polster began his coaching career in January 2010 as the reserve-team coach at LASK Linz. In June 2011, he became the head coach of SC Wiener Viktoria in the Austrian 2. Landesliga, the fifth-tier in Austrian football. During his first season at Wiener Viktoria, the team promoted to the fourth-tier and consequently a year after to the third division, the so-called Austrian Regional League. On 17 June 2013, he accepted his first coaching role in the Austrian Bundesliga, taking over as the head coach of the top-flight side Admira Wacker Mödling. After starting the season with three straight defeats, including a 7–1 defeat to newly promoted Scholz Grödig, Polster was fired by Admira on 9 August 2013. Polster returned to SC Wiener Viktoria on 13 January 2014.

Career statistics

Club

International

Scores and results list Austria's goal tally first, score column indicates score after each Polster goal.

Managerial 

1.Only 2010–11 season matches are included. Matches before 4 January 2010 – 6 August 2010 not included.
2.Only 2012–13 season matches are included. Matches from the 2011–12 season not included.

Honours

Club
Austria Wien
 Austrian Football Bundesliga: 1983–84, 1984–85, 1985–86
 Austrian Cup: 1985–86

Individual
 Austrian Football Bundesliga Top scorer: 1984–85, 1985–86, 1986–87
 Austrian Footballer of the Year: 1985–86, 1996–97

European Golden Shoe: 1986–87

References

External links
 
 Toni Polster at Austria Archive 
 
 
 

1964 births
Living people
Footballers from Vienna
Association football forwards
Austrian footballers
Austria youth international footballers
Austria international footballers
1990 FIFA World Cup players
1998 FIFA World Cup players
FK Austria Wien players
Torino F.C. players
Sevilla FC players
CD Logroñés footballers
Rayo Vallecano players
1. FC Köln players
Borussia Mönchengladbach players
FC Red Bull Salzburg players
Austrian Football Bundesliga players
Serie A players
La Liga players
Bundesliga players
Austrian football managers
FC Admira Wacker Mödling managers
Austrian expatriate footballers
Expatriate footballers in Italy
Expatriate footballers in Spain
Expatriate footballers in Germany
Austrian expatriate sportspeople in Spain
Austrian expatriate sportspeople in Italy
Austrian expatriate sportspeople in Germany